Tayifeh Michak (also Romanized as Ţāyīfeh Mīchak) is a village in Mobarakabad Rural District, in the Central District of Qir and Karzin County, Fars Province, Iran. At the 2006 census, its population was 38, in 6 families.

References 

Populated places in Qir and Karzin County